Rafsnyder-Welsh House is a historic home located in the Rittenhouse Square East neighborhood of Philadelphia, Pennsylvania. The original house was built about 1855, as a typical brick Philadelphia rowhouse consisting of a front building, piazza, and back building. It was extensively remodeled and enlarged to its present form in 1893–1894. As presently formed, it consists of a four-story front building, approximately 34 feet wide and 36 feet deep, connected to a four-story back building, by a four-story section. Attached to the back building is a three-story, brick wing and two-story wing. A four-story fire tower was added in 1922. It has an eclectic front facade of Pompeiian brick with sandstone and terra cotta trim.

The house was added to the National Register of Historic Places in 1980.

References

Houses on the National Register of Historic Places in Philadelphia
Houses completed in 1894
Rittenhouse Square, Philadelphia